Napoleon Touzet was a medical doctor of Austrian (Tyrolean) origin, who emigrated to Petropolis, Brazil. An avid naturalist, he collected specimens of animals, which he donated to Museums across Europe. 

Touzet received the following distinctions for his work:

 On March 4, 1859 the Knight's Cross of the Imperial Austrian Order of Franz Joseph. p.204
 Medal of the Order of the Polar Star by the King of Sweden
 Correspondent member of the Stockholm Academy of Sciences (Royal Swedish Academy of Sciences)

References 

Austrian naturalists
Brazilian explorers
Year of birth missing (living people)
Living people
Recipients of the Order of Franz Joseph